Cody Michael Fajardo (born March 29, 1992) is an American professional Canadian football quarterback for the Montreal Alouettes of the Canadian Football League (CFL). He played college football at Nevada and was their starting quarterback from 2011 to 2014. Fajardo accounted for over 13,000 yards and 101 touchdowns in his career at Nevada. He has also been a member of the Oakland Raiders, BC Lions, and Saskatchewan Roughriders.

He won the Glenn Davis Award in 2009 as the best high school football player in California. Fajardo is of Spanish American descent.

Early years
Fajardo played high school football for Servite High School in Anaheim, California.  As a senior, he led Servite to a state championship and a No. 3 ranking in the national polling.  He won the Glenn Davis Award in 2009 as the best high school football player in California.

Fajardo's father played college football for the Texas Tech Red Raiders, and his grandfather played for the Colorado Buffaloes.

College career
Fajardo committed to the University of Nevada, Reno in late January 2010.  He was redshirted during the 2010 season as Colin Kaepernick completed a four-year run as the starting quarterback for the Nevada Wolf Pack football team.

As a redshirt freshman, Fajardo became the starting quarterback for 2011 Nevada Wolf Pack football team.  Playing against Texas Tech in the third game of the 2011 season, Fajardo rushed for 139 yards and two touchdowns on 10 carries and completed four of six passes for 59 yards and a touchdown.  On October 15, 2011, he led the Wolfpack to a 49–7 win over New Mexico, running for two touchdowns and completing 20 of 25 passes for 203 yards. He finished 2011 with 1,707 passing yards, 6 passing touchdowns and 694 rushing yards and 11 rushing touchdowns.

Fajardo had 2,786 passing yards, 20 passing touchdowns, 1,121 rushing yards, and 12 rushing touchdowns. In 2013, he passed 2,668 yards, 13 passing touchdowns, 621 rushing yards and eight touchdowns. As a senior in 2014, he passed for 2,498 yards, 18 passing touchdowns and rushed for 1,046 yards and 13 touchdowns. Fajardo accounted for 101 touchdowns in his career at Nevada.

Fajardo is one of only two players in NCAA history with 9,000 yards passing and 3,000 yards rushing. The other player is Colin Kaepernick, who is also an alumnus of the University of Nevada.

College statistics

Professional career

Oakland Raiders
After going undrafted in the 2015 NFL Draft, Fajardo signed with the Oakland Raiders on May 8, 2015. On September 1, 2015, he was waived by the Raiders.

Toronto Argonauts
On October 8, 2015, Fajardo was signed to the practice roster of the Toronto Argonauts of the Canadian Football League. He re-signed with the Argonauts on May 17, 2016. Fajardo scored his first professional rushing touchdown on July 13, 2016, before throwing his first professional touchdown pass on July 25, 2016. Fajardo would see his role expand during 2017 into a change-of-pace backup while starter Ricky Ray sat out with injury, but remained the short yardage quarterback when Ray returned. He scored the game-winning touchdown with 23 seconds remaining in the 2017 East Final in short-yardage, on a 1-yard plunge against the Saskatchewan Roughriders, sending the Argonauts to the 105th Grey Cup game. The Argos would go on to win the championship game over the Calgary Stampeders. Although Fajardo showed considerable promise and poise when he played, the Argonauts were unable to sign him to a contract extension with the acquisition of James Franklin from the Edmonton Eskimos.

BC Lions
After failing to sign with the Argonauts and entering Free Agency, Fajardo signed with the BC Lions on February 16, 2018. Fajardo continued his role as a short down rusher and change of pace quarterback behind Travis Lulay and Jonathon Jennings, registering 14 completions on 20 attempts for 153 yards, one touchdown and one interception, as well as 42 rushes for 108 yards and 5 more scores.

Saskatchewan Roughriders
On the third day of free agency in 2019, Fajardo signed with the Saskatchewan Roughriders on a one-year contract, joining a quarterback room featuring Zach Collaros and David Watford. Fajardo became the starting quarterback following an injury to Collaros in the opening game of the season. He led the team to a win on July 1, 2019, throwing for 430 yards against the Toronto Argonauts. Fajardo continued to play well in the following weeks which prompted the Roughriders to trade Collaros to the Argonauts, solidifying their trust in Fajardo. On October 21, 2019. Fajardo agreed to a two-year contract extension with Saskatchewan. He signed a contract extension through the 2022 season with the team on January 5, 2021. Fajardo remained the starting quarterback for the Riders in 2021, leading the team to 9–5 record and secured a home playoff match against rival Calgary Stampeders, whom they defeated 33–30 in overtime despite Fajardo throwing four interceptions. The Riders were defeated in the Western Final by the eventual champions the Winnipeg Blue Bombers. On January 31, 2022 Fajardo and the Roughriders agreed to a restructured contract for the 2022 season. After starting the season with four wins in their first five games the season proved to be challenging for Cody Fajardo and the Riders as the team would go on to lose nine of their next 11 matches, culminating in Fajardo being benched for the Riders penultimate match. On February 13, 2023, one day before becoming a free agent, Fajardo posted on Twitter announcing that he would not be returning to Saskatchewan. He is rumoured to be joining the Alouettes.

Montreal Alouettes 
On the first day of free agency Fajardo signed a two-year contract with the Montreal Alouettes.

Career statistics

Regular season

Post Season

References

External links
Nevada Wolf Pack bio
Saskatchewan Roughriders bio
Official website

1992 births
People from Brea, California
Living people
American football quarterbacks
Canadian football quarterbacks
Players of Canadian football from California
Nevada Wolf Pack football players
Oakland Raiders players
Toronto Argonauts players
Players of American football from California
Servite High School alumni
Sportspeople from Orange County, California
BC Lions players
Saskatchewan Roughriders players